Novopetrovo is a rural locality (a selo) in Staropetrovsky Selsoviet, Birsky District, Bashkortostan, Russia. The population was 21 as of 2010. There is 1 street.

Geography 
Novopetrovo is located 28 km south of Birsk (the district's administrative centre) by road. Starobiktimirovo is the nearest rural locality.

References 

Rural localities in Birsky District